Bobbi Lancaster (born June 23, 1950) is a family physician, champion golfer, author, human rights advocate and motivational speaker. She is also a transgender woman, and underwent undergoing gender reassignment surgery in 2010. She attempted to qualify for the LPGA Tour in 2013 and her efforts garnered international media attention.

Early life
Bobbi Lancaster was born on June 23, 1950 in Chatham, Ontario, Canada. Her father, Douglas Lorne Lancaster, was a high school graduate and World War II U.S. paratrooper and later worked for Revenue Canada. He died in 1984. Bobbi's mother, Rosalie Clara Lancaster, was a farmer's daughter. At the age of fourteen, she finished formal education and worked in a garment factory making uniforms for the military. She married Douglas in 1948. Bobbi was the first of four children. The family lived in Chatham until 1956 and then moved to Ridgetown, a small town in southwestern Ontario farm country. Young Bobbi was an excellent student who excelled at all sports, delivered newspapers, studied butterflies, served mass as a Catholic altar boy and learned to play the piano. She was introduced to golf by her father, an excellent player, who was on the Board of Ridgetown Golf and Curling Club. The Lancasters moved to Hamilton, Ontario in 1960 where Lancaster continued piano studies with the Royal Conservatory of Music and caddied. She became caddy champion at Hamilton Golf and C.C. at fourteen years of age and attended Cathedral Boys High School where she was taught by Jesuit priests. Lancaster dreamed of being a professional golfer, a biologist, a pianist or perhaps a priest.

Struggles
Lancaster liked to cross-dress by wearing her cousin's dresses when they were not around and felt like a girl from the age of four or five. She hid these feelings from others because she knew she was different and had observed how badly others around her were treated because they were different. Her father was an abusive alcoholic who never knew of her struggles. At fourteen, Lancaster finally told a trusted parish priest about her desire to be a girl. She was told her thoughts and her cross-dressing were sinful. This news cemented Lancaster's decision to hide and she remained "closeted" until sixty years of age. She lived with a constant yearning to just live as the woman she knew herself to be. This led to depression and a near suicide in her fifties and ultimately culminated in the transition to life as Bobbi.

Medical career
She was an Ontario Scholar and received an academic scholarship to McMaster University in Hamilton, Ontario where she studied honors Biology (1969–1972). She received an Honor M for academic excellence and captained the men's varsity golf team to two OUAA Championships (1972 and 1974) She was accepted to McMaster Medical School in 1972 and ultimately was awarded an M.D. degree in 1978. She completed her family medicine residency in 1980 during which time she was elected Chief Resident. Lancaster passed her board certification and practiced in Hamilton until 1991. She provided obstetrical care, looked after children, assisted in surgery, attended hospitalized patients, made house calls and provided medical care for all age groups. She served as an assistant clinical professor from 1981 to 1991 where she taught medical students and residents. Lancaster was nominated as Canadian Family Practice Teacher of the Year in 1986. She served on many hospital committees and volunteered in the community. Most notably she served as a Board of Director for the Hamilton Catholic Children's Aid Society and became president in 1984.

In 1991, Lancaster moved to Phoenix, Arizona, where she became American Board Certified, established a family practice and continued to teach interns and residents at St. Joseph's Hospital. She took a leave of absence from practice in 2001 because she was struggling with depression and gender identity difficulties. During that time she volunteered at the Phoenix Art Museum, Phoenix Zoo and Boyce Thompson Arboretum. Lancaster resumed her medical career and ultimately became medical director of Advanced Healthcare of Mesa and Scottsdale (medical-surgical rehabilitation facilities). She also became a medical director with Hospice of the Valley.

She ultimately lost these positions during her gender transition in 2012. Lancaster then provided medical supervision of modified barium swallow studies (2012–2016) while she maintained her small concierge family practice in Gold Canyon, Arizona (2001 to present). She is a revered clinician and patients back in Hamilton, Ontario still wish she would return to care for them.

Golf career
She graduated from Cathedral Boys High School in 1969 as one of the top students. She had captained the varsity golf team and had participated on the track and field team. She high jumped six feet in a city meet. Lancaster also participated in soccer, hockey and the chess club.

Lancaster excelled at golf from a young age, winning the prestigious caddy championship at Hamilton Golf and C.C. in her early teens. At 11, she won a caddie tournament at the club, beating peers who were in their late teens. She also qualified for the Ontario Caddy Championship. During high school she captained the Cathedral Boys varsity team to multiple victories. She also won junior tournaments, interclub matches representing Chedoke Civic Golf Course and was victorious as a member of the CANUSA Games golf team. In her late teens and twenties, Lancaster won multiple club championships at Chedoke. She also qualified and competed in several Canadian and Ontario Amateur Championships as well as the Ontario Open, a professional event. Lancaster also captained the McMaster University Men's Varsity Golf Team to two OUAA Championships (1972 and 1974).

When she began her medical career in 1980, Lancaster joined Hamilton Golf and C.C. where she quickly became club champion and three-time Sclater Bowl champion. She successfully represented the club in interclub and Somerville Matches. Upon moving to Phoenix, she competed on the Western States Tour in 1997 and won a professional event at Palm Valley Golf Course. After moving to Gold Canyon, she became Senior Club Champion at Superstition Mountain Golf Club in 2008. After Lancaster's transition in 2012 and her unexpected unemployment and free time, she took up golf with renewed enthusiasm. She received permission from the USGA to compete as a female and promptly won the Papago Club Championship against some of the best players in Arizona. After several more victories, there were complaints that her prior status as a male gave her an unfair advantage around strength and distance. Lancaster basically handicapped herself and became a professional golfer in 2013. She competed on the Cactus Tour against elite players forty years younger. She enjoyed modest success and was instrumental in changing the Cactus Tour's female-at-birth gender policy. Lancaster then attempted to qualify for the LPGA Tour, under their new transgender policy, and competed in the LPGA Qualifying Tournament in 2013. She failed in her attempt but did gain conditional status on the Symetra Tour. Various life events curtailed her golf adventures (see Media and Advocacy below) and she regained her amateur status in 2016. Lancaster still competes occasionally and represented Papago Golf Course in interclub matches in 2017. She is also once again their club champion.

Media
When Lancaster became a professional golfer and attempted to qualify for the LPGA Tour at sixty three years of age, her story garnered international media attention. It started after Paola Boivin (senior sports columnist for the Arizona Republic) received a complaint from a fan about how inappropriate it was to see her playing on the Cactus Tour. This resulted in a full-length feature about her golf dreams, her personal life and her work as a physician. The story was picked up nationally and Boivin was nominated for a Sports Emmy. Following that article, stories appeared in the Canadian newspapers, Huffington Post, USA Today, Good Morning America, Canadian Medical Post. Lancaster agreed to interviews with TMZ Sports, Channel 12 News, New Times weekly newspaper, McMaster Times Alumnae magazine, Echo magazine, Freedom for All Americans and The League of Fans. There was a documentary that appeared on national television produced by the Golf Channel (interview conducted by multiple Emmy Award-winner Jimmy Roberts). There were also documentaries exploring Lancaster's life by Cronkite News, Sports Illustrated (golf.com) and the Human Rights Campaign (Arizona).

Advocacy
As a result of the media attention, Lancaster has become a minor celebrity. She has been asked to give educational and motivational speeches to various groups including students at the University of Kansas, Arizona State University, Chandler and Gilbert Community Colleges, Stanford School of Law and McMaster School of Medicine. She has also given speeches to Phoenix Valley Leadership, the Arizona Women Lawyers Convention in Tucson, the Performing Artists Medical Association International Symposium (NYC 2016). Lancaster's efforts promoting awareness of transgender issues caught the attention of the Human Rights Campaign. She was awarded their 2015 Equality Award at a gala in Phoenix in 2015 where her famous Humpty Dumpty acceptance speech can be found on YouTube. She was elected to their national Board of Directors in 2016. She has worked tirelessly on their behalf, lobbying on Capitol Hill and at the Arizona State Capitol. Lancaster has participated in a White House Summit, at town hall meetings and has canvassed and phone-banked for pro-LGBTQ candidates. She has also partnered with One Community and One n Ten to advocate for transgender acceptance and equality and has lobbied on her own as a private citizen. Lancaster was also elected to Echo Magazine's Hall of Fame in 2015.

Publications
Lancaster has authored many short nature stories that were published in the Gold Canyon Ledger.  She also wrote and illustrated a children's book called My Friend Flutter and wrote a short book about an unlikely meeting with her deceased father titled Fairway Secrets.  She has recently completed a full-length memoir called The Red Light Runner and is actively looking for a publisher at this writing.

See also
Lana Lawless, the transgender former police officer who sued the LPGA for the right to compete on the woman's circuits in 2010, leading to the change in regulations

References 

Canadian female golfers
LGBT golfers
Golfing people from Ontario
Canadian LGBT sportspeople
Transgender sportswomen
Canadian transgender writers
Transgender academics
Sportspeople from Chatham-Kent
21st-century Canadian short story writers
21st-century Canadian women writers
21st-century Canadian non-fiction writers
Canadian women short story writers
Canadian women memoirists
Canadian memoirists
Canadian children's writers
Transgender memoirists
1950 births
Living people
21st-century Canadian LGBT people
21st-century memoirists
Canadian LGBT academics